José Carlos da Silva Júnior (16 June 1926 – 5 March 2021) was a Brazilian politician and businessman.

Biography
He was a member of the Democratic Social Party and served as a Senator from 1996 to 1999 and Vice-Governor of the state of Paraíba from 1983 to 1986. He was also Director of the Federação das Indústrias da Paraíba and President of the Associação Brasileira da Indústria de Café. He died from COVID-19 in São Paulo, São Paulo, on 5 March 2021, at the age of 94, during the COVID-19 pandemic in Brazil.

References

Members of the Federal Senate (Brazil)
1926 births
2021 deaths
People from Campina Grande
Democratic Social Party politicians
Deaths from the COVID-19 pandemic in São Paulo (state)